Charles George Ashburner Nix (25 August 1873 – 3 March 1956) was a British sport shooter who competed at the 1908 Summer Olympics, where he won a silver medal.

Nix was educated at Eton College and the University of Cambridge. In the 1908 Olympics he won a silver medal in the team single-shot running deer event, was 10th in the single-shot running deer event and 11th in the double-shot running deer event.

A member of the Nix family, he was the son of John Hennings Nix, one of the partners in the London private bank Fuller, Banbury, Nix & Co, and Sarah Ashburner, an Indian-born wealthy heiress from Calcutta (now Kolkata). He inherited the family estate Tilgate House in Crawley from his older brother John Ashburner Nix in 1927, but sold the estate in 1939 as the family lived primarily in London. He was the great-grandfather of Alexander Nix.

References

External links
profile

1873 births
1956 deaths
British male sport shooters
Running target shooters
Olympic shooters of Great Britain
Shooters at the 1908 Summer Olympics
Olympic silver medallists for Great Britain
Olympic medalists in shooting
Medalists at the 1908 Summer Olympics
People educated at Eton College
Sportspeople from Crawley